The Forerunner of Revenge, also published in Latin and in German as Prodromus Vindictæ, was a pamphlet accusing George Villiers, 1st Duke of Buckingham of having caused the death of King James I of England by poison. It was written by George Eglisham, who had attended upon King James as a physician, and was first published anonymously with a Frankfurt address. It was in fact printed in Brussels by Jan van Meerbeeck. It contributed to the aura of suspicion that led to the Duke of Buckingham's murder, and was reprinted in 1642 to bring Charles I of England into discredit.

References

1626 books
1626 in England
Books about politics of England
Political books
17th-century Latin books
English non-fiction books